Sweet Dreams is the second album by the Canadian heavy metal band Sword, released in 1988 by Aquarius Records.

Track listing

Personnel
 Rick Hughes - Vocals, Keyboards
 Mike Plant - Guitar, Keyboards
 Mike Larock - Bass
 Dan Hughes - Drums

Production
 Sword - Producer
 Jack Richardson - Producer
 Garth Richardson - Producer, Engineer
 Renée Marc-Aurèle - Assistant Engineer
 Bill Kennedy - Mixing
 George Marino - Mastering
 George Chin - Photography

References

Sword (band) albums
1988 albums
Albums produced by Jack Richardson (record producer)
Aquarius Records (Canada) albums

it:Sweet Dreams